Tenishevo is the name of several inhabited localities in Russia.

Modern localities
Urban localities
Tenishevo, Republic of Tatarstan, an urban-type settlement in Kamsko-Ustyinsky District of the Republic of Tatarstan

Rural localities
Tenishevo, Republic of Mordovia, a selo in Shaversky Selsoviet of Krasnoslobodsky District in the Republic of Mordovia;

Alternative names
Tenishevo, alternative name of Tatarskoye Tenishevo, a village in Bolsheshustruysky Selsoviet of Atyuryevsky District in the Republic of Mordovia;